Hartmuth Behrens (born 3 March 1951) is a German fencer. He competed in the individual and team foil events for East Germany at the 1980 Summer Olympics.

References

External links
 

1951 births
Living people
People from Ludwigslust-Parchim
German male fencers
Sportspeople from Mecklenburg-Western Pomerania
Olympic fencers of East Germany
Fencers at the 1980 Summer Olympics